Katrin Apel (born 4 May 1973 in Erfurt) is a retired German biathlete. , . Apel now resides in Gräfenroda, and is a member of the SV Eintracht Frankenhain club. Like most German winter sport athletes, Apel is a sport soldier, performing normal soldier duties but released for training and competitions.

Apel began her career as a cross-country skier; between 1990 and 1994, her best results were third place in the junior World Championships 5 km classical in 1993, and second in the relay also in the Junior World Championships, in 1990. However, when Apel failed to qualify for the Olympics in Lillehammer in 1994, she made the decision, along with her friend and then training partner Steffi Kramer, to switch to biathlon.

Apel began biathlon in 1994 in the European Cup, the second division to the World Cup. In Apel's first season in the World Cup, 1995/96, she placed 33rd, but her results improved from then on. In the 1998/99 season she placed 8th, in 1999/00 10th, 2000/01 12th. The 2001/02 season was her best when she finished the season in 5th place. In that season Apel placed 13th in the individual, 4th in the sprint, 4th in the pursuit, and 12th in the mass start. The year after she could only finish a lowly 20th place. She bounced back to 7th in the 2003/04 season and 8th again in 2004/05, where her best discipline was the pursuit, in which she finished 7th.

Apel has had 18 podium finishes in the World Cup. Four wins, five second places and nine third places. All but one of her World Cup wins were in the 2001/02 season when she came 5th in the final standings. Also three of the four wins were in the sprint. Apel is a solid shooter in the prone position, averaging mid 80% over the years, but her standing shoot lets her down, only in the low 70%, though it has improved from mid 60% from a few years ago.

Apel has four Olympic medals, two gold, one silver, and one bronze. Her only solo medal is a bronze in the sprint in the 1998 Winter Olympics. She won the other medals in relay events. Apel has ten World Championship medals, four gold, five silver, and one bronze. However, only two of the medals are solo medals, one a silver won in Oslo's Holmenkollen ski festival in 2000 in the sprint, and the other, also a silver, won in the mass start in Oberhof in 2004. The remaining medals were won in relays.

References

External links 
 
 Short Q&A with Katrin
 Apel fansite

German female biathletes
1973 births
Living people
Sportspeople from Erfurt
Olympic biathletes of Germany
Biathletes at the 1998 Winter Olympics
Biathletes at the 2002 Winter Olympics
Biathletes at the 2006 Winter Olympics
Olympic gold medalists for Germany
Olympic silver medalists for Germany
Olympic bronze medalists for Germany
Olympic medalists in biathlon
Biathlon World Championships medalists
Medalists at the 2006 Winter Olympics
Medalists at the 2002 Winter Olympics
Medalists at the 1998 Winter Olympics